Marvin E. Dillman was a member of the Wisconsin State Assembly.

Biography
Dillman was born on July 12, 1907, in Revillo, South Dakota. Dillman received his bachelor's degree from University of Illinois at Urbana–Champaign. He was an elementary school principal, worked with the United States Indian Service, and served on the Vilas County School Committee. Dillman owned a summer resort. He lived in Lac du Flambeau, Wisconsin.

Career
Dillman was a member of the Assembly from 1955 to 1958. He was a Republican.

References

1907 births
1972 deaths
People from Grant County, South Dakota
People from Lac du Flambeau, Wisconsin
University of Illinois Urbana-Champaign alumni
Businesspeople from Wisconsin
Educators from Wisconsin
School board members in Wisconsin
Republican Party members of the Wisconsin State Assembly
20th-century American businesspeople
20th-century American politicians